San Marcos Consolidated Independent School District is a public school district based in San Marcos, Texas, USA. The school district covers 210 square miles mainly in Hays County and portions of Guadalupe and Caldwell counties.

In addition to San Marcos, the district also serves the towns of Martindale, Reedville and parts of Maxwell. The district extends into small portions of Caldwell and Guadalupe counties.

San Marcos High School is home to the San Marcos Fightin' Rattlers. Since 1911, the San Marcos Rattlers have been competing in sports with teams from the Austin and San Antonio area.  Today the Rattlers compete at the Texas 6A level.  They are one of the smallest 6A schools in the area. The football team won its district in 2000 and 2003 and went as far as the Regional Finals in 1999 and 2006.  In 2017, the Fightin’ Rattlers won district and continued onto state playoffs. 
 
In 2004, San Marcos Consolidated ISD voters approved close to $123 million in bonds. These bonds paid for a new San Marcos High School that is able to serve over 2,500 students; as of 2006 San Marcos High School had a student population of 1,990. Also with the bond money, SMCISD built new elementary and middle schools throughout the district. The new San Marcos High School opened in August 2007, and all the elementary schools in the district were completed and opened by Fall of 2009.

In 2011, the school district was rated "academically acceptable" by the Texas Education Agency.

In May, 2013, San Marcos Consolidated ISD voters approved another $77 million in bonds.

Schools

High School (Grades 9-12)
San Marcos High School
Phoenix Academy

Middle Schools (Grades 6-8)
Miller Middle School
Goodnight Middle School - TEA Recognized
1999-2000 National Blue Ribbon School

Elementary Schools (PreK-5)

Bonham PreKindergarten
Bowie Elementary - TEA Exemplary
Crockett Elementary - TEA Exemplary
DeZavala Elementary - TEA Recognized
Travis Elementary - TEA Recognized
Hernandez Elementary - TEA Recognized
Mendez Elementary (Opened in Fall 2009)
Rodriguez Elementary

References

External links

San Marcos Consolidated ISD

School districts in Hays County, Texas
School districts in Guadalupe County, Texas
School districts in Caldwell County, Texas
San Marcos, Texas